The 1960 Furman Purple Hurricane football team was an American football team that represented Furman University as a member of the Southern Conference (SoCon) during the 1960 NCAA University Division football season. In their third season under head coach Bob King, Furman compiled a 5–4–1 record.

Schedule

References

Furman
Furman Paladins football seasons
Furman Purple Hurricane football